The 2003 Texas Tech Red Raiders football team represented Texas Tech University as a member of the Big 12 Conference during the 2003 NCAA Division I-A football season. In their fourth season under head coach Mike Leach, the Red Raiders compiled an 8–5 record (4–4 against Big 12 opponents), finished in fourth place in Southern Division of the Big 12, defeated Navy in the 2003 Houston Bowl, and outscored opponents by a combined total of 552 to 442. The team played its home games at Jones SBC Stadium in Lubbock, Texas.

Quarterback B. J. Symons totaled 5,833 passing yards and received the Sammy Baugh Trophy, and Wes Welker totaled 1,099 receiving yards and received the Mosi Tatupu Award.

Schedule

Personnel

Game summaries

Texas A&M

    
    
    
    
    
    
    
    
    
    
    
    
    

B.J. Symons 34/46, 505 Yards, 8 TDs (Big 12 record)

Colorado

References

Texas Tech
Texas Tech Red Raiders football seasons
Houston Bowl champion seasons
Texas Tech Red Raiders football